Sandie may refer to:


People
 Sandie Clair (born 1988), French professional racing cyclist
 Sandie Fitzgibbon, Irish former camogie player
 Sandie Jones (1950/1951–2019), Irish singer
 Sandie Lindsay, 1st Baron Lindsay of Birker (1879-1952), British academic
 Sandie Pendleton (1840-1864), Confederate officer in the American Civil War
 Sandie Richards (born 1968), Jamaican track and field athlete
 Sandie Rinaldo (born 1950), Canadian television journalist and news anchor
 Sandie Shaw (born 1947), English pop singer
 Shelley Sandie (born 1969), Australian Olympic basketballer

Arts and entertainment
 Sandie (album), by Sandie Shaw
 Sandie (comics), a British girls' comic
 Sandie Merrick, a character on the ITV soap opera Emmerdale Farm

Other uses
 Sandie (cookie), a type of sugar or shortbread cookie, e.g. a pecan sandie
 Sandie River, Taiwan

See also
Sandy (disambiguation)
Sandi (disambiguation)

Unisex given names